The 2011–12 Ligue Nationale du football Amateur is the first season of the league under its current title and first season under its current league division format. A total of 42 teams will be contesting the league. The league is scheduled to start on September 16, 2011.

League table

Groupe Est

Groupe Centre

Groupe Ouest

References

Ligue Nationale du Football Amateur seasons
3
Algeria